The Bandarawela Hotel is a 33-room British colonial two-star hotel located in Bandarawela, Sri Lanka.

The century-old British-built property is associated with the development of the hill-country railway and is situated within walking distance from the railway station. Bandarawela Hotel's origins date back to the turn of the 19th / 20th century when the railways were being extended by the British from Nanu Oya to the southern highlands as a Railway Hotel. The foundation stone for the building was laid in 1893 for a tea planter's club. It was subsequently converted into a rest house and was used as a sanitarium by British soldiers and officers recovering from the Second World War. In 1938 there was a refurbishment and extension of the building to its present capacity. The hotel had a 'European Only' policy until Sri Lankan independence in 1948. 

To this day, it remains locked in time somewhere between the 1930s and 1950s and is an alternative to some of the more modern facilities in the area. The hotel shows the influence of British architecture during the period of colonial era in this region. The hotel consists of 33 colonial rooms with British furniture. Currently the Bandarawela Hotel is managed by the Aitken Spence group.

Facilities

 Restaurant (70 seats)
 Swimming Pool
 Conference Facilities
 Lounge bar and public bar
 Badminton court
 Tennis court
 Golf course

References

External links
Official web page of Bandarawela Hotel
The twin attractions at Bandarawela

Archaeological protected monuments in Badulla District
Hotels in Badulla District
Rail transport in Badulla District
Railway hotels
Buildings and structures in Bandarawela
Heritage hotels in Sri Lanka